Leroy Township is a township in Barton County, Missouri, USA.  As of the 2000 census, its population was 238.

The origin of the name Leroy is obscure.

Geography
According to the USGS, it contains two cemeteries: Leroy and Shiloh.

The streams of Bitter Creek, East Fork Dry Wood Creek and West Elm Branch run through this township.

References

 USGS Geographic Names Information System (GNIS)

External links
 US-Counties.com
 City-Data.com

Townships in Barton County, Missouri
Townships in Missouri